"Give It to You" is the debut solo single by American singer Jordan Knight (from New Kids on the Block) from his self-titled album, Jordan Knight (1999). It is his most well-known single to date as a solo artist.

Chart performance
The song became Knight's first and only top 10 solo hit on the Billboard Hot 100, peaking at number 10. It also hit number 35 on the Hot Dance Music/Club Play chart, and reached gold status soon afterward. It peaked at number 5 on the UK Singles Chart.

Music video
Directed by Darren Grant, the video starts off in an amusement park with Knight and his friends getting off by a Land Rover Defender. His friends start off with a ballroom dance and then move into complex hip-hop choreography. The music video is based on the movie Grease, with the cool guy at first overlooking the "nerdy" girl. But when she shows up in a tight leather outfit and stubs out her cigarette (like Sandy does at the end of Grease), he finally notices her and they dance. Choreographer Darrin Henson makes a cameo appearances in the music video, on the left to Jordan Knight in the red. He was also the choreographer of the dance in the video. The Miami bass break in the video was only heard on selected versions of the single.

The video was nominated for Best Dance Video at the 1999 MTV Video Music Awards, but was given to "Livin' La Vida Loca" by Ricky Martin.

Live performance
On May 25, 1999, Knight promoted the release of his self-titled debut album by performing the song live on Live with Regis and Kathie Lee.

Track listings
US CD maxi-single
"Give It to You" (Video Version) - 4:29
"Give It to You" (95 South Remix) - 5:13
"Give It to You" (Red Tacones Edit) - 3:50
"Give It to You" (Red Tacones Dark Dub) - 7:15
"Give It to You" (Fernando G's Radio Edit) - 4:22

UK CD single
"Give It to You" (10° Below Steelpan Vocal) - 5:22
"Give It to You" (10° Below Musique Vocals) - 4:20
"Give It to You" (Stepchild Radio Edit) - 4:26
"Give It to You" (95 South Remix) - 5:13

Charts and certifications

Weekly charts

Year-end charts

Certifications

|}

Release history

References

1999 songs
1999 debut singles
Jordan Knight songs
Interscope Records singles
Music videos directed by Darren Grant
Song recordings produced by Jimmy Jam and Terry Lewis
Songs written by Jimmy Jam and Terry Lewis
Songs written by Robin Thicke
Songs written by Jordan Knight
Electro songs